My Daughter Lives in Vienna is a 1940 German comedy film directed by E. W. Emo and starring Elfriede Datzig, Hans Moser, and O. W. Fischer.

Cast
Elfriede Datzig as Gretl Klaghofer
Hans Moser as Florian Klaghofer
O. W. Fischer as Hauser Chauffeur
Charlott Daudert as Ada de Niel
Dorit Kreysler as Marga
Hedwig Bleibtreu as Aunt Ottilie
Hans Olden as Felix Frisch
Theodor Danegger as Marga's father
Annie Rosar as Kindermann, economist
Pepi Glöckner-Kramer
Gisa Wurm
Anton Pointner as Probst, Juwelier

Egon von Jordan as Helmuth Wittner

References

External links

Films of Nazi Germany
German comedy films
1940 comedy films
Films directed by E. W. Emo
Films set in Vienna
German black-and-white films
1940s German films